The Buick Envision is a compact crossover SUV manufactured by General Motors. It is exclusively manufactured in China by the SAIC-GM joint venture, supplying the Chinese and North American markets.



Concept
The Envision was first introduced in 2011 as a design concept. It was a small crossover with two large scissor doors opening upward.  The concept was a plug-in hybrid with advanced technology such as a solar roof and head-up display.  The waterfall grille made it to the production version of the Envision.

First generation (2014)
 

The Envision was first introduced in China in August 2014, also known by its Chinese name, “Ang Ke Wei” (昂科威). It went on sale in China on October 20th.

The Envision debuted in the U.S. at the North American International Auto Show on January 11, 2016, sharing the segment with a second generation GMC Terrain and the Chevrolet Equinox.  It went on sale in the United States in the summer of 2016, making it the first Chinese-built GM vehicle to be sold in America. It was initially offered with all-wheel drive, and subsequently with optional front-wheel drive for model year 2017.

Both were initially paired with a third-generation six-speed transmission. For the 2016 model year, the Envision was only available in Premium I and Premium II trim levels, with the 2.0L turbo engine, seven active safety technologies, and OnStar/Intellilink connectivity. The trim levels expanded to five for the 2017 model year.

In addition to the larger engines offered in North America, Chinese buyers also have the option of a turbocharged 1.5-liter unit.

Trim levels for the first generation Envision were known as the 20T and 28T.

2019 facelift
The 2019 Envision debuted in late 2017 in China, and in 2018 for the North American market. It features revised rear styling and tail lights, stop/start calibration, and new seating design. The transmission for the 2.0-litre turbo engine was upgraded to a 9-speed automatic.

2020 facelift
The 2020 Envision facelift debuted in early 2020 in China, and would be sold alongside the second generation models called the Envision S in China. It features revised front and rear end styling.

Second generation (2021)

In May 2020, GM introduced the second generation of the Envision in the United States. It is powered by a 2.0L turbocharged four-cylinder engine producing  and  torque, paired with a 9-speed automatic transmission.  The 2021 Envision includes a suite of standard safety features, including blind spot monitor, lane departure warning, and forward collision alert.  Four trim levels are offered: base, Preferred, Essence, and for the first time, Buick's premium Avenir trim.

In China, the new Envision is sold alongside the first-generation Envision as the Envision S. The new Envision continues to be assembled in China at the SAIC-GM Dongyue Motors plant in Yantai alongside the previous generation model. The second generation Envision now shares the E2XX platform with the Cadillac XT4.

Envision Plus
Launched during the 2021 Shanghai Auto Show, the Buick Envision Plus is a stretched version of the Envision that serves as a three-row crossover SUV variant of the regular Buick Envision S in China.

Sales
In 2017, the Envision was Buick's third bestselling model in the U.S. with sales of just over 41,000 units.  Sales in the U.S. dropped 27% in 2018 but rebounded slightly in 2019.  In 2020, Envision was the only Buick model in the U.S. to see a sales increase over 2019.

Tariff Impact

On August 6, 2018, General Motors announced that it might withdraw the Envision from the United States and Canada markets due to the China-United States trade war, should a request to seek a waiver to continue to import the vehicle be denied. GM sought the waiver amid a trade disagreement between the United States and China over tariffs that could hurt the sales of the Envision. The automaker sees the potential exemption as "the only way" to continue offering the vehicle to U.S. consumers, according to GM President Dan Ammann. The exemption was denied on May 29, 2019, but GM has opted to pay the tariffs without raising the price on the vehicle for the time being. Buick is confident that ongoing talks between China and the United States could spare the Envision's future in North America.

References

External links

 

All-wheel-drive vehicles
Envision
Crossover sport utility vehicles
Compact sport utility vehicles
Front-wheel-drive vehicles
2010s cars
Cars introduced in 2014